Cribrihammus is a genus of longhorn beetles of the subfamily Lamiinae, containing the following species:

 Cribrihammus granulosus Dillon & Dillon, 1959
 Cribrihammus rugosus Dillon & Dillon, 1959

References

Lamiini